Michael Haydn's Symphony No. 13 in D major, Perger 37, Sherman 13, MH 132, believed to have been written in Salzburg in 1768, was at one time mistaken for a symphony by Joseph Haydn (Hob. I:D26).

Scored for flute, 2 oboes, 2 bassoons, 2 horns, 2 trumpets, timpani and strings, it is unusual in that its third movement consist of two minuets:

Allegro
Andante, in G major
Menuettos I & II
Allegro molto assai

Discography

As part of the Bournemouth Sinfonietta complete series of Haydn's symphonies conducted by Harold Farberman, an LP containing Symphony No. 13 (misidentified as Symphony No. 14) coupled with Haydn's Symphony No. 4 was released in 1984 on Vox Cum Laude – D-VCL 9086.

References
 A. Delarte, "A Quick Overview Of The Instrumental Music Of Michael Haydn" Bob's Poetry Magazine November 2006: 33 - 34 PDF
 Charles H. Sherman and T. Donley Thomas, Johann Michael Haydn (1737 - 1806), a chronological thematic catalogue of his works. Stuyvesant, New York: Pendragon Press (1993)
 C. Sherman, "Johann Michael Haydn" in The Symphony: Salzburg, Part 2 London: Garland Publishing (1982): lxv

Symphony 13
Compositions in D major
1768 compositions